Nima Kadivar (born 23 August 1994) is a Swedish professional futsal player who plays for Hammarby IF in the Swedish Futsal League and the Swedish national futsal team. He was nominated for the award of Swedish futsal player of the year in 2019.

Club career
Kadivar joined the futsal team of IFK Göteborg in 2017, competing in the Swedish Futsal League.

In ahe semi-final match against AFC Eskilstuna in 2020, Nima Kadivar suffered a serious knee injury, which kept him sidelined throughout the whole 2020–21 season. During his long rehabilitation period, he became the head coach of IFK Göteborg's women's futsal team. Under his leadership in 2020–21, IFK Göteborg were crowned Swedish champions, after a 3–2 win over local rivals GAIS in the final.

Nima Kadivar signed for Hammarby futsal 2022 after his second comeback to the Swedish futsal League. Nima Kadivar klar för Bajen. After almost 2 years of absence due to knee injuries followed by 2 surgeries and 2 years of rehabilitation, Nima Kadivar played his first game for Hammarby futsal in February against IFK Uddevalla.

International career
Kadivar made his debut for the Sweden national futsal team on 11 November 2017 against Hungary, and has represented Sweden in the 2017, 2018 and 2019 editions of the Nordic Futsal Cup. He scored a goal in the opening match of their 2020 FIFA Futsal World Cup qualification campaign for a 3–1 win over Armenia on 30 January 2019.

References

External links
 

1994 births
Living people
Sportspeople from Gothenburg
Swedish people of Iranian descent
Sportspeople of Iranian descent
Swedish men's futsal players
Iranian expatriate futsal players
Swedish international futsal players